The International Thespian Festival is an annual week-long theatre festival that brings together U.S. high school theatre clubs, thespian troupes, and programs.  Organized by the International Thespian Society, it was held annually in late June on the campus of the University of Nebraska–Lincoln in Lincoln, Nebraska until 2020. In 2022, its first in-person year after the COVID-19 Pandemic, the International Thespian Festival was held at Indiana University in Bloomington, Indiana.

There are over 120 workshops offered during the festival, including such titles as "Creating Believable Stage Villains", "Period Hatmaking", and "Fun with Dialects." These workshops are taught by high school teachers, college professors and theater professionals.

There are also auditions for national cast productions, usually to premiere the school edition of two well-known Broadway shows. In 2008 the chosen casts and crews put on a productions of "Hairspray" and "Sweeney Todd".

The festival features an event called the National Individual Events Showcase. This gives students the chance to perform in the categories of monologue, duet acting, solo/duet/group musical theatre, and mime, or show off their skills in the technical of categories costume design and construction, publicity design, scenic design, stage management, lighting design, and short film.

References

External links
International Thespian Festival

Festivals in Nebraska
University of Nebraska–Lincoln
Student theatre
Theatre festivals in the United States